Morris Massey (born 1939) is a marketing professor/sociologist, and producer of training videos.

Education
His undergraduate and M.B.A. degrees are from the University of Texas, Austin, and his Ph.D. in business is from Louisiana State University.

Career
During the late 1960s through the 1970s, as an Associate Dean and Professor of Marketing, at the University of Colorado at Boulder, he received four awards for teaching excellence.

Dr Massey was honored with the W.M. McFeely award presented by the International Management Council for "significant contribution to the field of management and human relations." During the 1980s and 90s he was the #1 ranked resource for the Young Presidents Organization International. In What Works At Work (Lakewood Publications, 1988) he was cited as one of the 27 most influential workplace experts of the time. His work is focused on values, generations, and Significant Emotional Events (SEE).

Development of values
Morris Massey has described three major periods during which values are developed.

1. The Imprint Period. Up to the age of seven, we are like sponges, absorbing everything around us and accepting much of it as true, especially when it comes from our parents. The confusion and blind belief of this period can also lead to the early formation of trauma and other deep problems. The critical thing here is to learn a sense of right and wrong, good and bad. This is a human construction which we nevertheless often assume would exist even if we were not here (which is an indication of how deeply imprinted it has become).

2. The Modeling Period. Between the ages of eight and thirteen, we copy people, often our parents, but also other people. Rather than blind acceptance, we are trying on things like suit of clothes, to see how they feel. We may be much impressed with religion or our teachers. You may remember being particularly influenced by junior school teachers who seemed so knowledgeable—maybe even more so than your parents.

3. The Socialization Period. Between 13 and 21, we are very largely influenced by our peers. As we develop as individuals and look for ways to get away from the earlier programming, we naturally turn to people who seem more like us. Other influences at these ages include the media, especially those parts which seem to resonate with the values of our peer groups.

Retirement
He retired in 1995 from the consulting/speaking circuit and now lives with his wife, Judith Ford Massey, in New Orleans, Louisiana. They have twin sons, Ryan Massey and Blake Massey.

Video programs 
 What You Are Is Where You Were When... AGAIN!
 Just Get It!
 Flashpoint: When Values Collide
 The Original Massey Tapes - 1: What You Are Is Where You Were When
 The Original Massey Tapes - 3: What You Are Is
 The Original Massey Tapes - 4: What You Are Is Where You See
 What You Are Is What You Choose…So Don't Screw It Up
 Dancing With The Bogeyman
 The Massey Triad Program 1: What You Are Is Where You Were When
 The Massey Triad Program 2: What You Are is Not What You Have To Be
 The Massey Triad Program 3: What You Are Is Where You See

See also 
 Significant Emotional Event (SEE)
 University of Colorado at Boulder

References

External links 
 Changing Minds

1939 births
Living people
Louisiana State University alumni